= Carol K. Watson =

Wyoming politician

Member of the Wyoming House of Representatives

Carol K. Watson is an American Democratic politician from Cheyenne, Wyoming. She represented the Laramie district in the Wyoming House of Representatives from 1989 to 1992.
